Thiago Rodrigues de Souza (born 18 March 1997), known as just Thiago, is a Brazilian professional footballer who plays as a midfielder for Polish club Puszcza Niepołomice, on loan from Cracovia.

Honours

Club
Cracovia
 Polish Cup: 2019–20

References

Living people
1997 births
Association football midfielders
Brazilian footballers
Red Bull Brasil players
Operário Futebol Clube (MS) players
Sandecja Nowy Sącz players
MKS Cracovia (football) players
Puszcza Niepołomice players
Ekstraklasa players
I liga players
III liga players
People from Campo Grande
Sportspeople from Mato Grosso do Sul
Expatriate footballers in Poland
Brazilian expatriate footballers
Brazilian expatriate sportspeople in Poland